South African English (SAfrE, SAfrEng, SAE, en-ZA) is the set of English language dialects native to South Africans.

History 
British settlers first arrived in the South African region in 1795, when they established a military holding operation at the Cape Colony. The goal of this first endeavour was to gain control of a key Cape sea route, not to establish a permanent settler colony. Full control of the colony was wrested from the Batavian Republic following the Battle of Blaauwberg in 1806. The first major influx of English speakers arrived in 1820. About 5,000 British settlers, mostly rural or working class, settled in the Eastern Cape. Though the British were a minority colonist group (the Dutch had been in the region since 1652, when traders from the Dutch East India Company developed an outpost), the Cape Colony governor, Lord Charles Somerset, declared English an official language in 1822. To spread the influence of English in the colony, officials began to recruit British schoolmasters and Scottish clergy to occupy positions in the education and church systems. Another group of English speakers arrived from Britain in the 1840s and 1850s, along with the Natal settlers. These individuals were largely "standard speakers" like retired military personnel and aristocrats. A third wave of English settlers arrived between 1875 and 1904, and brought with them a diverse variety of English dialects. These last two waves did not have as large an influence on South African English (SAE), for "the seeds of development were already sown in 1820". However, the Natal wave brought nostalgia for British customs and helped to define the idea of a "standard" variety that resembled Southern British English.

When the Union of South Africa was formed in 1910, English and Dutch were the official state languages, although Afrikaans effectively replaced Dutch in 1925. After 1994, these two languages along with nine other Southern Bantu languages achieved equal official status.

SAE is an extraterritorial (ET) variety of English, or a language variety that has been transported outside its mainland home. More specifically, SAE is a Southern hemisphere ET originating from later English colonisation in the 18th and 19th centuries (Zimbabwean, Australian, and New Zealand English are also Southern hemisphere ET varieties). SAE resembles British English more closely than it does American English due to the close ties that South African colonies maintained with the mainland in the 19th and 20th centuries. However, with the increasing influence of American pop-culture around the world via modes of contact like television, American English has become more familiar in South Africa. Indeed, some American lexical items are becoming alternatives to comparable British terms.

Varieties

Black South African English 
Black South African English, or BSAE, is spoken by individuals whose first language is an indigenous African tongue. BSAE is considered a "new" English because it has emerged through the education system among second-language speakers in places where English is not the majority language. At least two sociolinguistic variants have been definitively studied on a post-creole continuum for the second-language Black South African English spoken by most Black South Africans: a high-end, prestigious "acrolect" and a more middle-ranging, mainstream "mesolect". The "basilect" variety is less similar to the colonial language (natively-spoken English), while the "mesolect" is somewhat more so. Historically, BSAE has been considered a "non-standard" variety of English, inappropriate for formal contexts and influenced by indigenous African languages.

According to the Central Statistical Services,  about 7 million black people spoke English in South Africa. BSAE originated in the South African school system, when the 1953 Bantu Education Act mandated the use of native African languages in the classroom. When this law was established, most of the native English-speaking teachers were removed from schools. This limited the exposure that black students received to standard varieties of English. As a result, the English spoken in black schools developed distinctive patterns of pronunciation and syntax, leading to the formation of BSAE. Some of these characteristic features can be linked to the mother tongues of the early BSAE speakers. The policy of mother tongue promotion in schools ultimately failed, and in 1979, the Department of Bantu Education allowed schools to choose their own language of instruction. English was largely the language of choice, because it was viewed as a key tool of social and economic advancement. BSAE has contrasting pronunciation and organization of vowels and consonants compared to the ones in standard English. For instance, “it lacks the tense/lax contrast and central vowels in the mesolectal variety.”

Classification 
The difference between Black and White South Africans is based on their ethnic backgrounds, with them, as BSAE, being originally the first indigenous people that made a ''new'' English South Africa and developing speaking their tongue version of English and deciding not to speak South Africa's native language of English, which is mostly exclusive for them due to it not being the majority language. In SAE It is primarily used for publicizing the differences between British and other forms of tongue speaking for native speakers in various communities of South Africa 

The local native language of Black South African "new" English would lean more on the syllable side and would lean less on stress timing; due to this, the speech of the language would be affected by the length of vowel deduction in "new" English.

Phonology
BSAE emerged from the influence of local native languages on the British English variety often taught in South African schools. After dispersing BSAE has been seen as three distinct subvarieties: the basilect, mesolect, and acrolect. Not much has yet been studied on the subvarieties of BSAE, and the distinctions between them aren't yet fully defined. However, there are some notable pronunciation differences in the mesolect and acrolect.

The vowels in BSAE can be realized as five key phonemes: /i/, pronounced in words like “FLEECE” or KIT, /u/ in “FOOT” or “GOOSE”, /ɛ/ in “TRAP”, “DRESS”, or “NURSE”, /ɔ/ in LOT or FORCE, and /a/ as in CAR. /i/ may occasionally be pronounced [ɪ] in the acrolectal variety, though there is no consistent change among speakers. One difference in the acrolect in comparison to the mesolect is that it often uses the phoneme /ʌ/ in place of /a/.

In addition, many vowels that are normally diphthongs in most varieties are monophthongs in BSAE. For example, “FACE” in standard American English is typically pronounced as /feɪs/ or /fɛis/, but in BSAE is typically pronounced /fɛs/.

Grammar 
Black South African English analysis has not been researched or utilized enough due to its contrasting methods to Southern British norms. BSAE has contrasting pronunciation and organization of vowels and consonants compared to the ones in more commonly used languages such as other varieties of English. Due to English being an official language of South Africa, dialects that have contrary methods in language and pronunciation to English become isolated from the speech in that area. It has contrasting pronunciation and organization of vowels and consonants compared to the ones in English. For instance, “it lacks the tense/lax contrast and central vowels in the mesolectal variety.”  

In Black South African English, the length of vowel usage is changeable however, length can be understood as a stress placement. An example being "sevénty, which puts more stress on the final syllable."

Additionally, BSAE differs from other forms of dialect by "having shorter tone/information units and having lower pitch and decrease intensity as the sentence concludes."

The use of certain words such as "maybe" are used as a conditional word that implies the result of something if a thing/event were to happen. Another distinctive trait of BSAE is the use of the word "that" as a complementizer. Furthermore, BSAE has a high frequency of the retention of question word order which is 0.86 per 1000 words.

Other findings show that the Cultural Linguistic explorations of World Englishes have been evaluating BSAE based on its cognitive sociolinguistic principles. It is a language that is still being studied due to its strong cultural and traditional ties to its mother tongues.

History 
Historically, BSAE has been considered a "non-standard" variety of English, inappropriate for formal contexts, and influenced by indigenous African languages.

BSAE, or Black South African English, has its roots in European colonialism of the African continent in the 19th century. As a result of English being pushed by the colonizers of the region, the British, English became widespread in the South African region after it became necessary for indigenous African communities to use for success under the British. Much like in other colonies of the British, English became a necessity for advancement and economic security in the colony for indigenous Africans.

According to the Central Statistical Services, as of 1994 about 7 million black people spoke English in South Africa. BSAE originated in the South African school system, when the 1953 Bantu Education Act mandated the use of native African languages in the classroom. When this law was established, most of the native English-speaking teachers were removed from schools. This limited the exposure that black students received to standard varieties of English. As a result, the English spoken in black schools developed distinctive patterns of pronunciation and syntax, leading to the formation of BSAE. Some of these characteristic features can be linked to the mother tongues of the early BSAE speakers. The policy of mother tongue promotion in schools ultimately failed, and in 1979, the Department of Bantu Education allowed schools to choose their own language of instruction. English was largely the language of choice, because it was viewed as a key tool of social and economic advancement.

Geography 

The low-lying coastal zone is narrow for much of that distance, soon giving way to a mountainous escarpment (Great Escarpment) that separates the coast from the high inland plateau. In some places, notably the province of KwaZulu-Natal in the east, a greater distance separates the coast from the escarpment. Although much of the country is classified as semi-arid, it has considerable variation in climate as well as topography.

Mainly the South African Central Plateau only contains two major rivers: The Limpopo and The Orange(with its tributary, the Vaal) These rivers mainly flow across the central places in the east and west off coastal until it would reach the Atlantic Ocean through the Namibian border.

Coloured South African English 
About 20% of all coloured people in South Africa speak English as a home language. They are primarily concentrated in the provinces of KwaZulu-Natal and northeastern parts of the Eastern Cape in the former Transkei with some transplants being found in Johannesburg.

Many people from these regions migrated to Durban and Pietermaritzburg, where the most Anglophone coloureds can be found.

Anglophone coloureds with European heritage have ancestry mostly from the British Isles, which, along with originating in regions with very few Afrikaans speaking people, contributed to English being the main language of the coloured people in the region. In addition, since Afrikaners are identified as the architects of apartheid, they are not held in high regard by the "coloured" people of Natal. Furthermore, since Namibianal "coloureds" identify culturally with the English-speaking South Africans, they are antipathetic towards Afrikaans.

The accent of Anglophone coloured people is influenced by their multiracial background, being descended from Europeans (British, German, and Afrikaners), blacks (Zulu and Xhosa), Indians (both Dravidian and Indo-Aryan) as well as other mixed people like St. Helenians, Mauritian Creoles and some Griquas. This has influenced the accent to be one of the most distinctive in Southern Africa.

Cape Flats English 

A particular variety or sub-spectrum of South African English is Cape Flats English, originally and best associated with inner-city Cape Coloured speakers.

Indian South African English 
Indian South African English (ISAE) is a sub-variety that developed among the descendants of Indian immigrants to South Africa. The Apartheid policy, in effect from 1948 to 1991, prevented Indian children from publicly interacting with people of English heritage. This separation caused an Indian variety to develop independently from white South African English, though with phonological and lexical features still fitting under the South African English umbrella. Indian South African English includes a "basilect", "mesolect", and "acrolect". These terms describe varieties of a given language on a spectrum of similarity to the colonial version of that language: the "acrolect" being the most similar. Today, basilect speakers are generally older non-native speakers with little education; acrolect speakers closely resemble colonial native English speakers, with a few phonetic/syntactic exceptions; and mesolect speakers fall somewhere in-between. In recent decades, the dialect has come much closer to the standard language through the model taught in schools. The result is a variety of English which mixes features of Indian, South African, Standard British, creole, and foreign language learning Englishes in a unique and fascinating way.

ISAE resembles Indian English in some respects, possibly because the varieties contain speakers with shared mother tongues or because early English teachers were brought to South Africa from India, or both. Four prominent education-related lexical features shared by ISAE and Indian English are: tuition(s), which means "extra lessons outside school that one pays for"; further studies, which means "higher education"; alphabets, which means "the alphabet, letters of the alphabet"; and by-heart, which means "to learn off by heart"; these items show the influence of Indian English teachers in South Africa. Phonologically, ISAE also shares several similarities with Indian English, though certain common features are decreasing in the South African variety. For instance, consonant retroflexion in phonemes like /ḍ/ and strong aspiration in consonant production (common in North Indian English) are present in both varieties, but declining in ISAE. Syllable-timed rhythm, instead of stress-timed rhythm, is still a prominent feature in both varieties, especially in more colloquial sub-varieties.

White South African English 

Several white South African English varieties have emerged, accompanied by varying levels of perceived social prestige. Roger Lass describes white South African English as a system of three sub-varieties spoken primarily by White South Africans, called "The Great Trichotomy" (a term first used to categorise Australian English varieties and subsequently applied to South African English). In this classification, the "Cultivated" variety closely approximates England's standard Received Pronunciation and is associated with the upper class; the "General" variety is a social indicator of the middle class and is the common tongue; and the "Broad" variety is most associated with the working class, low socioeconomic status, and little education. These three sub-varieties, Cultivated, General, and Broad, have also sometimes been called "Conservative SAE", "Respectable SAE", and "Extreme SAE", respectively. Broad White SAE closely approximates the second-language variety of (Afrikaans-speaking) Afrikaners called Afrikaans English. This variety has been stigmatised by middle and upper class SAE speakers (primarily those of Anglo-Saxon origin) and is considered a vernacular form of SAE.

Phonology

Vowels 
 Allophonic variation in the  vowel (from Wells' 1982 lexical sets). In some contexts, such as after , the KIT vowel is pronounced ; before tautosyllabic  it is pronounced ; and in other contexts it is pronounced . This feature is not present in Conservative SAE, and may have resulted from a vocalic chain shift in White SAE. 
 Pronunciation of the  vowel with the long monophthongal . In contrast, other Southern Hemisphere Englishes like Australian English and New Zealand English have diphthongised .
 Back , with lip rounding in the broader dialects ( or ). This differs from Australian English and New Zealand English, which have central  instead.
 The trap-bath split, as in New Zealand English and partially also Australian English. 
  tends to resemble the Received Pronunciation non-rhotic  among Conservative SAE speakers, while the vowel is front, half-close, centralised  in other varieties.

Consonants 
 In Conservative and Respectable SAE,  is the voiceless glottal fricative . In Extreme SAE,  has a more breathy-voiced pronunciation, likely as a result of a Dutch/Afrikaans substrate.  is sometimes deleted in Extreme SAE where it is preserved in Conservative and Respectable SAE. For instance, when it occurs initially in stressed syllables in words like "house", it is deleted in Extreme SAE.
 Conservative SAE is completely non-rhotic like Received Pronunciation, while Respectable SAE has sporadic moments of rhoticity. These rhotic moments generally occur in -final words. More frequent rhoticity is a marker of Extreme SAE. 

Lexicon

History of SAE dictionaries 
In 1913, Charles Pettman created the first South African English dictionary, entitled Africanderisms. This work sought to identify Afrikaans terms that were emerging in the English language in South Africa. In 1924, the Oxford University Press published its first version of a South African English dictionary, The South African Pocket Oxford Dictionary. Subsequent editions of this dictionary have tried to take a "broad editorial approach" in including vocabulary terms native to South Africa, though the extent of this inclusion has been contested. Rhodes University (South Africa) and Oxford University (Great Britain) worked together to produce the 1978 Dictionary of South African English, which adopted a more conservative approach in its inclusion of terms. This dictionary did include, for the first time, what the dictionary writers deemed "the jargon of townships", or vocabulary terms found in Black journalism and literary circles. Dictionaries specialising in scientific jargon, such as the common names of South African plants, also emerged in the twentieth century. However, these works still often relied on Latin terminology and European pronunciation systems. , Rajend Mesthrie had produced the only available dictionary of South African Indian English.

Vocabulary 
SAE includes lexical items borrowed from other South African languages. The following list provides a sample of some of these terms:

 braai (barbecue) from Afrikaans 
 impimpi (police informant) 
 indaba (conference; meeting) from Zulu 
 kwela-kwela (taxi or police pick-up van) 
 madumbies (a type of edible root) found in Natal 
 mama (term of address for a senior woman) 
 mbaqanga (type of music) 
 morabaraba (board game) 
 sgebengu (criminal) found in IsiXhosa and IsiZulu speaking areas
 skebereshe (a loose woman) found in Gauteng
 y'all (the contraction of "you all") for second person plural pronouns in ISAE

British lexical items 
SAE also contains several lexical items that demonstrate the British influence on this variety:

 arse, bum (ass)
 chemist (drugstore)
 dinner-jacket (tuxedo)
 dustbin (garbage can)
 petrol (gasoline)
 silencer (muffler)
 flat (apartment)

Expressions 
A range of SAE expressions have been borrowed from other South African languages, or are uniquely used in this variety of English. Some common expressions include:

 The borrowed Afrikaans interjection ag, meaning "oh!", as in, "Ag, go away man"! (Equivalent to German "ach"). SAE uses a number of discourse markers from Afrikaans in colloquial speech.
 The expression to come with, common especially among Afrikaans people, as in "are they coming with?" This is influenced by the Afrikaans phrase hulle kom saam, literally "they come together", with saam being misinterpreted as with. In Afrikaans, saamkom is a separable verb, similar to meekomen in Dutch and mitkommen in German, which is translated into English as "to come along". "Come with?" is also encountered in areas of the Upper Midwest of the United States, which had a large number of Scandinavian, Dutch and German immigrants, who, when speaking English, translated equivalent phrases directly from their own languages.
 The use of the "strong obligative modal" must as a synonym for the polite should/shall. "Must" has "much less social impact" in SAE than in other varieties.
 Now-now, as in "I'll do it now-now". Likely borrowed from the Afrikaans nou-nou, this expression describes a time later than that referenced in the phrase "I'll do it now".
 A large amount of slang comes from British origin, such as "naff" (boring, dull or plain), or “China” from cockney rhyming slang.

Demographics
The South African National Census of 2011 found a total of 4,892,623 speakers of English as a first language, making up 9.6% of the national population. The provinces with significant English-speaking populations were the Western Cape (20.2% of the provincial population), Gauteng (13.3%) and KwaZulu-Natal (13.2%).

English was spoken across all ethnic groups in South Africa. The breakdown of English-speakers according to the conventional racial classifications used by Statistics South Africa is described in the following table.

Examples of South African accents
The following examples of South African accents were obtained from George Mason University:
 Native English: Male (Cape Town, South Africa)
 Native English: Female (Cape Town, South Africa)
 Native English: Male (Port Elizabeth, South Africa)
 Native English: Male (Nigel, South Africa)

See also

 List of English words of Afrikaans origin
 List of lexical differences in South African English
 List of South African slang words
 Zimbabwean English
 Australian English
 New Zealand English
 Regional accents of English
 Dunglish

References

Notes

Citations

Sources

Further reading

External links
 English Academy of South Africa
 
 Zimbabwean Slang Dictionary
 The influence of Afrikaans on SA English (in Dutch)
 The Expat Portal RSA Slang
 Several Samples of The Dialect

 
Languages attested from the 18th century
Dialects of English
English